Reading is a small town in the parish of Saint James in northwestern Jamaica. It is located West of Montego Bay.

References 

Populated places in Saint James Parish, Jamaica